Jason Johannisen (born 8 November 1992) is a South African born professional Australian rules footballer who plays for the Western Bulldogs in the Australian Football League (AFL). At 180 cm (5ft 11in) tall and 82 kg (181 lb), he plays as a running half-back who can move up forward. 

Since then, he has been an AFL premiership player, and a winner of the Tony Liberatore Most Improved Player Award, which he received in 2015. He has polled a total of 25 Brownlow Medal votes in his career.

Early life
Johannisen was born in Johannesburg, South Africa, and moved to Perth, Western Australia with his family when he was eight years old.

Career
Johanissen was recruited by the Western Bulldogs in the 2011 Rookie Draft, with pick #39, and made his debut in Round 19 of the 2012 AFL season, against  at Docklands Stadium.

Johanissen was adjudged best afield in the Western Bulldogs' Grand Final victory over the Sydney Swans in 2016. He recorded 25 kicks among 33 disposals and 7 marks to win the Norm Smith Medal. After speculation about his playing future at the Western Bulldogs in 2017 - previously being linked to both Western Australian clubs and Essendon - he re-signed with the club for a further 5 years to remain at the Bulldogs until at least 2022.

Statistics
 Statistics are correct to the end of Round 8 2021

|- 
! scope="row" style="text-align:center" | 2012
|
| 39 || 3 || 1 || 0 || 29 || 20 || 49 || 9 || 3 || 0.3 || 0.0 || 9.7 || 6.7 || 16.3 || 3.0 || 1.0  || 0
|- style="background-color: #EAEAEA"
! scope="row" style="text-align:center" | 2013
|
| 39 || 13 || 2 || 4 || 138 || 70 || 208 || 40 || 19 || 0.2 || 0.3 || 10.6 || 5.4 || 16.0 || 3.1 || 1.5 || 0
|- 
! scope="row" style="text-align:center" | 2014
|
| 39 || 11 || 2 || 4 || 111 || 67 || 178 || 42 || 26 || 0.2 || 0.4 || 10.1 || 6.1 || 16.2 || 3.8 || 2.4 || 0
|- style="background-color: #EAEAEA"
! scope="row" style="text-align:center" | 2015
|
| 39 || 20 || 7 || 3 || 270 || 128 || 398 || 107 || 35 || 0.4 || 0.2 || 13.5 || 6.4 || 19.9 || 5.4 || 1.8 || 4
|- 
| scope=row bgcolor=F0E68C | 2016# 
|
| 39 || 17 || 6 || 8 || 283 || 130 || 413 || 112 || 37 || 0.4 || 0.5 || 16.6 || 7.6 || 24.3 || 6.6 || 2.2 || 10
|- style="background-color: #EAEAEA"
! scope="row" style="text-align:center" | 2017
|
| 39 || 20 || 10 || 12 || 258 || 171 || 429 || 58 || 41 || 0.5 || 0.6 || 12.9 || 8.6 || 21.5 || 2.9 || 2.1 || 7
|- 
! scope="row" style="text-align:center" | 2018
|
| 39 || 22 || 7 || 10 || 277 || 187 || 464 || 89 || 47 || 0.3 || 0.5 || 12.6 || 8.5 || 21.1 || 4.0 || 2.1 || 3
|- style="background-color: #EAEAEA"
! scope="row" style="text-align:center" | 2019
|
| 39 || 20 || 6 || 6 || 285 || 152 || 437 || 83 || 44 || 0.3 || 0.3 || 14.3 || 7.6 || 21.9 || 4.2 || 2.2 || 1
|- 
| scope=row | 2020
|
| 39 || 17 || 6 || 5 || 165 || 102 || 267 || 65 || 29 || 0.4 || 0.3 || 9.7 || 6.0 || 15.7 || 3.8 || 1.7 || 0
|- style="background-color: #EAEAEA"
! scope="row" style="text-align:center" | 2021
|
| 39 || 25 || 15 || 10 || 152 || 99 || 251 || 67 || 41 || 0.6 || 0.5 || 6.1 || 4.0 || 10.0 || 2.7 || 1.6 || 0
|- 
! scope="row" style="text-align:center" | 2022
|
| 39 || 7 || 6 || 4 || 50 || 32 || 82 || 28 || 11 || 0.9 || 0.6 || 7.1 || 4.6 || 11.7 || 4.0 || 1.6 ||
|- style="background-color: #EAEAEA"
|- class="sortbottom"
! colspan=3| Career
! 175
! 68
! 68
! 2018
! 1158
! 3176
! 701
! 333
! 0.4
! 0.4
! 11.5
! 6.6
! 18.2
! 4.0
! 1.9
! 25
|}

Notes

Honours and achievements
AFL
Team
AFL premiership: 2016
Individual
Norm Smith Medal: 2016
Tony Liberatore Most Improved Award: (2015)

VFL
Team
VFL premiership: 2014

References

External links

1992 births
VFL/AFL players born outside Australia
Australian rules footballers from Perth, Western Australia
East Fremantle Football Club players
Living people
Norm Smith Medal winners
South African emigrants to Australia
Western Bulldogs players
Western Bulldogs Premiership players
Williamstown Football Club players
Sportspeople from Johannesburg
One-time VFL/AFL Premiership players
Coloured South African people